The list of Honorary Doctors of the University of Auckland below shows the recipients of honorary doctorates conferred by the University of Auckland since 1962.

References

Auckland
Lists of New Zealand people
New Zealand education-related lists